Wilmar Valdez (born 10 July 1965) is a Uruguayan football executive who served as interim President of CONMEBOL between 11 December 2015 and 26 January 2016. He took up the position after the resignation of Juan Ángel Napout which was related to the 2015 FIFA corruption case. Between 2014 and 2018 Valdez served as president of the Uruguayan Football Association. He is also a member of the FIFA Council.

Career
Valdez was born in Tala on 10 July 1965. During his time as a student in Montevideo he became a fan of the football club Rentistas. At age 21 Valdez started working for the club. His relationship with the club was further strengthened when his brother started playing there. Valdez also worked as a sports journalist for a while. At Rentistas he served in different functions, including terms as Secretary General and President for four years.

On 3 April 2014 Valdez was elected as president of the Uruguayan Football Association, where he was the candidate for Rentistas. He succeeded Sebastián Bauzá as President. He resigned his position on 30 July 2018 for personal reasons.

Valdez was elected third Vice President of CONMEBOL on 4 March 2015. On 11 December 2015, after the resignation of CONMEBOL president Juan Ángel Napout related to the 2015 FIFA corruption case, Valdez became interim President. First Vice President Rafael Esquivel had already been arrested in May and second Vice President Sergio Jadue had entered into a guilty plea with United States prosecutors the day before Valdez his appointment. Valdez's term as interim President ended on 26 January 2016, when a CONMEBOL congress was convened to elect new officials. His successor was Alejandro Domínguez.

Personal life
Valdez is married and has two children.

References

1965 births
Living people
FIFA officials
People from Canelones Department
Presidents of CONMEBOL
Presidents of the Uruguayan Football Association
Uruguayan football chairmen and investors
Association football executives